NA-144 Khanewal-I is a constituency for the National Assembly of Pakistan.

Election 2002 

General elections were held on 10 Oct 2002. Muhammad Raza Hayat Hiraj of PPP won by 86,438 votes.

Election 2008 

General elections were held on 18 Feb 2008. Muhammad Raza Hayat Hiraj of PML-Q won by 71,381  votes.

Election 2013 

General elections were held on 11 May 2013. Mohammad Raza Hayat Hiraj  won by 79,695 votes as independent candidate and became the  member of National Assembly, latter, he joined PML-N.

Election 2018

By-election 2023 
A by-election will be held on 19 March 2023 due to the resignation of Syed Fakhar Imam, the previous MNA from this seat.

See also
NA-143 Sahiwal-III
NA-145 Khanewal-II

References

External links 
Election result's official website

NA-156